Anstaing is a commune in the Nord department in northern France.

The name is probably of Germanic origin, meaning "village of Anst".

Population

Heraldry

See also
Communes of the Nord department

References

Communes of Nord (French department)
French Flanders